Tararua is a genus of South Pacific funnel weavers first described by Raymond Robert Forster & C. L. Wilton in 1973.

Species
 it contains seven species:
Tararua celeripes (Urquhart, 1891) — New Zealand
Tararua clara Forster & Wilton, 1973 — New Zealand
Tararua diversa Forster & Wilton, 1973 — New Zealand
Tararua foordi Forster & Wilton, 1973 — New Zealand
Tararua puna Forster & Wilton, 1973 — New Zealand
Tararua ratuma Forster & Wilton, 1973 — New Zealand
Tararua versuta Forster & Wilton, 1973 — New Zealand

References

Agelenidae
Araneomorphae genera
Taxa named by Raymond Robert Forster